Czechoslovakia made its Paralympic Games début at the 1972 Summer Paralympics in Heidelberg, where it was one of just four Eastern Bloc nations competing (the other three being Hungary, Poland and Romania). Czechoslovakia sent a delegation of nineteen athletes, who all competed in track and field, and won a single bronze medal in the shot put.

The country's participation in the Summer Paralympics was sporadic. It missed the 1976 Games, sent a delegation of seven athletes to the 1980 Summer Paralympics in Arnhem, missed the 1984 Games, then competed in 1988 and 1992, before its dissolution in 1993. At the Winter Paralympics, however, Czechoslovakia took part in the inaugural Games in Örnsköldsvik in 1976 (with a delegation of five athletes), and participated in every edition of the Games until its dissolution. Since 1994, the Czech Republic and Slovakia have competed separately.

During their nine participations in the Paralympics, Czechoslovakians won a total of 27 medals - seven gold, ten silver and ten bronze. Thus the country ranks fifty-fourth on the all-time Paralympic Games medal table (behind both of its successor states).

Only four Czechoslovakians have won gold medals at the Paralympic Games. Eva Lemezová is the country's most successful Paralympian, having won three gold medals in women's alpine skiing in 1976, as well as a silver in 1980. Pavla Valníčková won two gold medals in track events in 1992, as well as a bronze, and a bronze and a silver in cross-country skiing that same year. Miloslava Běhalová won a gold in the discus in 1992, and Vojtěch Vašíček is Czechoslovakia's only male Paralympic champion, having won the pentathlon in 1992.

Medallists

See also
 Czechoslovakia at the Olympics

References